Kotkan Työväen Palloilijat Basket, shortly KTP Basket, is the largely independent basketball team of Kotkan Työväen Palloilijat, a Finnish sports club based in Kotka, and has played in the Korisliiga since 1957. The club has won the Finnish championship six times.

Trophies
Finnish Championships: 6
1958, 1967, 1988, 1991, 1993, 1994
Runner-up: 1960, 1961, 1985, 1986, 1987, 1990, 2013
Bronze: 1957, 1959, 1964, 1966, 1970, 1976, 1982, 1984, 2004, 2011, 2015, 2019

Finnish Cups: 9 
1978, 1983, 1984, 1985, 1987, 1990, 1993, 2003, 2004

Sponsorship names
Due to sponsorship reasons the team has also been known as:
Team TEHO Sport (2013–14; European competitions)

Players

Current roster

Individual awards
Korisliiga MVP
 Larry Pounds – 1991
 Jerald Fields – 2007
 Tim Blue – 2012

Notable players

Season by season

External links
Official website

Basketball teams established in 1927
Basketball teams in Finland
Kotka